Fosli is a surname. Notable people with the surname include:

Åse Fosli (1924–2009), Norwegian politician
Halvor Fosli (born 1961), Norwegian non-fiction writer, journalist, magazine editor, and publisher

Norwegian-language surnames